Psilorhynchus homaloptera or torrent stone carp is a fish found in genus Psilorhynchus. It is found in India, Burma, China and Nepal.

References

homaloptera
Taxa named by Sunder Lal Hora
Taxa named by Dev Dev Mukerji
Fish described in 1935